Ever Jair Palma Olivares (born March 18, 1992 in Zitácuaro, Michoacán) is a Mexican racewalker. He competed for Mexico in 20 kilometres walk at the 2012 Summer Olympics in London.

His older brother, Isaac, is also a racewalker.

References

1992 births
Living people
Mexican male racewalkers
Olympic athletes of Mexico
Athletes (track and field) at the 2012 Summer Olympics
Athletes (track and field) at the 2016 Summer Olympics
Sportspeople from Michoacán
People from Zitácuaro
21st-century Mexican people